Vazgen Sargsyan Republican Stadium also known as the Republican Stadium is an all-seater multi-use stadium located on 65 Vardanants street, in the Armenian capital Yerevan. The stadium was built between 1933 and 1935. It was officially opened in 1935 as Dinamo Stadium. Further developments were implemented in 1953, after the end of World War II. It is mainly used for association football and is the home ground of the Armenia national football team. The capacity of the stadium is 14,403 seats.

History

The stadium was opened in 1935 during the Soviet days as Dinamo Stadium. In 1999, after a major renovation, the name was changed to Republican Stadium (Hanrapetakan Stadium). By the end of 1999, after the assassination of the former prime minister of Armenia Vazgen Sargsyan, the name of the stadium was officially changed to Vazgen Sargsyan Republican Stadium. It is currently used for football matches and is the home ground of the Armenia national football team as well as the local teams Ararat Armenia and Pyunik who both play in the Armenian Premier League.

A major renovation of the stadium was envisaged to take place in 1995, but the process was delayed due to financial difficulties. In 1999, a large-scale renovation process was launched and more than US$3 million were spent on the development of the infrastructure, the seats and many other facilities, with the financial assistance of the UEFA Executive Committee. By the end of 2000, the stadium was completely renovated with a fully covered seating facilities.

The Republican Stadium was named after Vazgen Sargsyan by a presidential decree on December 28, 1999. Vazgen Sargsyan was the commander of the Armenian forces during the First Nagorno-Karabakh War and served as Defence Minister from 1995 to 1999 and Prime Minister from June to October 27, 1999, when he and other high-ranked officials were killed in the Armenian parliament shooting.

Another major renovation was carried on in 2008 through the Israeli company Green Diversified Ltd. The playing pitch was entirely replaced with a modern surface, the VIP sections were repaired and a modern security system was installed in the stadium to meet the UEFA standards. By the end of August 2008, the stadium was ready to host matches on the new pitch. As a result of the installment of new VIP sections, the seating capacity was reduced from 14,968 to 14,403.

Attendance records
11 October 2003, Euro 2004 qualifying Group 6: Armenia 0-4 Spain, att. 16,000.
22 August 2007, Euro 2008 qualifying Group A:  Armenia 1-1 Portugal, att. 15,550.
13 June 2015, Euro 2016 qualifying Group I:  Armenia 2-3 Portugal, att. 14,527.
7 October 2011, Euro 2012 qualifying Group B:  Armenia 4-1 Macedonia, att. 14,403.
12 October 2012, 2014 World Cup qualification Group B: Armenia 0-3 Czech Republic, att. 14,403.
26 March 2011, Euro 2012 qualifying Group B: Armenia 0-0 Russia, att. 14,400.

Gallery

References

Buildings and structures completed in 1935
Armenia
Athletics (track and field) venues in Armenia
Football venues in Armenia
Armenia national football team
FC Pyunik
Ulisses FC
Sports venues in Yerevan
1935 establishments in Armenia
FC Ararat-Armenia